Frankfurt Yeshiva may refer to:
 Torah Lehranstalt, yeshiva of the Breuer family before the Holocaust
 Yeshiva Gedolah Frankfurt, operating Chabad yeshiva

Disambiguation pages